M98 or M-98 may refer to:
 M98 (New York City bus), a New York City Bus route in Manhattan
 Barrett M98, a Bolt-action sniper rifle
 Gewehr 98, a German bolt-action rifle
 Messier 98, an intermediate spiral galaxy about 60 million light-years away in the constellation Coma Berenices
 M-98 (Michigan highway), a former state highway in Michigan

nl:M98